Melica nutans, known as mountain melick, is a grass species in the family Poaceae, native to European and Asian forests.

Description 
The grass has slender creeping rhizomes. They are comprise out of 2-3 fertile florets that are diminished at the apex.

Habitat

References

nutans
Flora of Europe
Flora of temperate Asia
Flora of the Indian subcontinent
Grasses of China
Grasses of India
Grasses of Pakistan
Plants described in 1753
Taxa named by Carl Linnaeus